1 Lancaster Circus is a municipal facility in Birmingham, England. It was the headquarters of West Midlands County Council from its formation in 1974 until its abolition in 1986.

History
The building formed part of an initiative in the 1960s by Birmingham City Council to improve the road infrastructure in the area and to redevelop the city centre. The site selected for development had previously been occupied by the "Perryian Pen Works", a business owned by Perry & Co., which ceased trading on the site in the 1960s. The factory was demolished in the late 1960s and replaced, briefly, by a motor car and cycle accessory depot.

The conversion of the depot into an office block, which was designed in the brutalist style, was completed in the early 1970s. The design of the new building preserved the shape of the motor depot with a main frontage of 17 bays facing the Lancaster Circus roundabout, and then a long side wing of 34 bays extending along Staniforth Street. The office block served as the headquarters of West Midlands County Council from its formation in April 1974 becoming known as "County Hall".

Following the abolition of the county council in 1986, the building was renamed 1 Lancaster Circus and occupied, as workspace, by the architecture, engineering, building, finance, environmental and consumer services departments of Birmingham City Council. A programme of refurbishment works to convert the building to an open plan layout was undertaken by Wates Group at a cost of £23 million to plans by architects, Urban Design, and completed September 2010. The redevelopment, which increased the capacity of the building from 800 occupants to 2,000 occupants and involved the installation of 179 chilled beams, won a regional award from the British Council for Offices in 2011.

References

Buildings and structures in Birmingham, West Midlands
County halls in England